Persona honrada se necesita (Honest Person Needed) is a 1941 Argentine comedy film.

Production

The 77 minute black and white comedy was directed for Lumiton by Francisco Múgica, written by Carlos A. Olivari and Sixto Pondal Ríos.
It was released in Argentina on 13 August 1941.
The film starred Francisco Petrone, Alicia Vignoli and Marcelo Ruggero.
This was the third film directed by Múgica in 1941, after El mejor papá del mundo and Los martes, orquídeas.
It was designed as a vehicle for Francisco Petrone.

Synopsis

The leader of a gang of thieves (Francisco Petrone) is on the run from the police. 
He wins the lottery, and needs someone honest to collect the prize for him.
He has diverse underworld friends, but none can be trusted.
Given the risk of being sent to prison for perhaps fifty years, the honest person must be very, very special.
He finally finds the woman he needs living in a boarding house.
Alicia Vignoli answers his want ad, which gives the film's title. She is wide-eyed and innocent, and does not realize she is being hired by a crook.
Petrone falls in love, and decides to become honest himself.

Reception

The film was well-received, described as a good-humored comedy.

Cast
The cast includes:

 Francisco Petrone
 Alicia Vignoli
 Marcelo Ruggero
 Pedro Maratea
 Edna Norrell
 Rosa Catá
 Carlos Morganti
 Alberto Terrones
 José Ruzzo
 Eliseo Herrero
 Pedro Bibe
 Alfredo Fornaresio
 René Pocoví
 Salvador Sinaí

References
Citations

Sources

1941 films
1940s Spanish-language films
Argentine black-and-white films
Films directed by Francisco Múgica
Argentine comedy films
1941 comedy films